Dadadu is a small town in Sirmaur district of Himachal Pradesh and is situated at a height of 640 meters from sea level.  This small town is 34 km from Nahan and 285 km from Delhi. The famous natural lake Renuka Ji, named after the mother of Lord Parshuram is 2 km away from Dadahu.

Situated on the foothills of mountains, Dadahu overlooks the meeting of two rivers which then take on a new direction as the river Giri which about 30 km later drains into Yamuna. Surrounded by mountains on three sides some of which become snow peaked briefly in December/January and the two meeting rivers on the fourth side. There are so many nature water falls is away from six and eight km surrounding of Dadahu. Projected Renuka dam site is 3 km meter on Dadahu Haripurdar road. The total population is about 4500 and there is a 50 bedded hospital.

There is accommodation available in the Government Rest House, and Kisan Bhavan, Devicose Plaza, HP State Tourism Hotel at the edge of Renuka Ji lake.
The lake Renuka Ji with a circumference of 3.4 km is surrounded by tall mountains. There are activities such as fish and tortoise feeding, as well as boat rides. 

Cities and towns in Sirmaur district